Ulla Johanna Caroline Grane (born 19 April 1978, in Stockholm) is a Swedish realtor who works in New York City, United States. She has also participated in the Swedish reality series Svenska Hollywoodfruar on TV3. Grane grew up in Stockholm and in the mid-2000s moved to New York to start her career as a realtor, she has a MBA in finance. She is employed at the real estate agency Nest Seekers. Grane is a childhood friend of Fredrik Eklund and she has also appeared on the Bravo show Million Dollar Listing New York as a friend of Eklund.

Grane agreed to participate in the eighth season of Svenska Hollywoodfruar in 2015 after actress Britt Ekland had decided to drop out.

References

Living people
1978 births
Actresses from Stockholm
Swedish television personalities
Swedish expatriates in the United States